Ulrich Adam (born 9 June 1950 in Teterow) is a German politician and member of the CDU. A mathematician and economist by profession, he was a directly elected member of the German Bundestag from 1990 to 2009. He didn't run for the elections in 2009. Ulrich Adam holds a Federal Cross of Merit.

External links 
 Official biography of Ulrich Adam on the Bundestag's website 
 Ulrich Adam's website 

1950 births
Living people
People from Teterow
Members of the Bundestag for Mecklenburg-Western Pomerania
University of Rostock alumni
Recipients of the Cross of the Order of Merit of the Federal Republic of Germany
Members of the Bundestag 2005–2009
Members of the Bundestag 2002–2005
Members of the Bundestag 1998–2002
Members of the Bundestag 1994–1998
Members of the Bundestag 1990–1994
Members of the Bundestag for the Christian Democratic Union of Germany